Kolonia-Kamień is a village in the administrative district of Gmina Łaziska, within Opole Lubelskie County, Lublin Voivodeship, in eastern Poland.

The village has a population of 60.

References

Villages in Opole Lubelskie County